The rowing competitions at the 2012 Olympic Games in London were held from 28 July to 4 August 2012, at Dorney Lake which, for the purposes of the Games venue, was officially termed Eton Dorney. Fourteen medal events were contested by 550 athletes, 353 men and 197 women.

Great Britain was the most successful nation, topping the medal table with four golds and nine in total. New Zealand finished second with three golds and five medals overall.

Venue

The venue has eight lanes and is 2,200 m in length with a capacity of 30,000 spectators.

Qualification

Each competing nation may qualify one boat for each of the fourteen events. The majority of qualification places were awarded based on results at the 2011 World Championships, held at Lake Bled, Slovenia, in August and September. Places are awarded to National Olympic Committees, not the specific athletes, finishing in the top 11 of men's events and top seven to nine of women's events, except in the eights where the first seven in the men's event and first five in the women's qualified. Further berths were allocated at three continental qualifying regattas in Africa, Asia and Latin America and a final Olympic qualification regatta in Lucerne, Switzerland.

Events 
There were eight events for men and six for women. Events included categories for open weight and restricted weight (lightweight) athletes, and two styles of rowing: sweep, where competitors each use a single oar, and sculling, where they use two.

Sculling events include men's and women's singles, doubles, lightweight doubles, and quads. Sweep events are men's and women's pairs and eights, and men's fours and lightweight fours.

Schedule

Medal summary

Medal table

Men's events

Women's events

References

External links 

 
 
 

 
2012 Summer Olympics events
Olympics
2012
Rowing competitions in the United Kingdom